Cayetano José Sarmiento Tunarrosa (born 28 March 1987) is a Colombian professional road bicycle racer, who currently rides for amateur team Ingeniería de Vías.

Major results

2007
 3rd Overall Vuelta al Ecuador
1st Stage 1
2008
 1st Overall Clásica Marinilla
1st Stage 2
 1st Overall Clásica Nacional Ciudad de Anapoima
1st Stage 1
 2nd Overall Clásica Internacional de Bogotá
 3rd Overall Clásica Club Deportivo Boyacá
 3rd Overall Vuelta a Colombia (under-23)
1st Stage 6
 7th Overall Vuelta al Ecuador
2009
 1st Overall Girobio
 Pan American Road Championships
2nd Under-23 road race
3rd Road race
 2nd Road race, National Under-23 Road Championships
 2nd Overall Clasica Alcaldía de Pasca
 2nd Overall Clásica Rionegro con Futuro-Aguas de Rionegro
 4th Overall Giro della Valle d'Aosta Mont Blanc
 5th Overall Clásica Ciudad de Girardot
 5th Overall Clásica Nacional Ciudad de Anapoima
2010
 5th Overall Tour of Slovenia
2012
 1st  Mountains classification Critérium du Dauphiné
2013
 9th Overall Vuelta a Burgos

Grand Tour general classification results timeline

Other major stage races

References

External links

Liquigas-Cannondale profile

Cycling Quotient profile

Colombian male cyclists
1987 births
Living people
Sportspeople from Boyacá Department
21st-century Colombian people